The Volkswagen Taigun is a subcompact crossover SUV (B-segment) manufactured by the German automaker Volkswagen since 2021. Manufactured in India and destined for the Indian and Mexican markets, the Taigun is based on the Volkswagen T-Cross.

The "Taigun" nameplate can be traced from 2012 when Volkswagen unveiled an unrelated smaller crossover SUV concept car with the same name. It was based on the Up city car and was planned to be mass-produced in 2016 for Europe, Brazil and India. However, the Up-based Taigun project was ultimately cancelled.

Overview 
The prototype version of the T-Cross-based Taigun was showcased in Auto Expo in February 2020 and is planned on sale by mid-2021. The Taigun is based on the long-wheelbase version of the T-Cross, with several differences. For example, the Taigun shares a similar front-end with the Chinese-market T-Cross, and the C-pillar is also slightly reworked. Volkswagen stated the vehicle is built on the Volkswagen Group MQB A0 IN platform dedicated for the Indian market. The platform is also shared with the Škoda Kushaq which debuted in March 2021.

The car is localized with up to 95% of its parts.

The production version of the Taigun was revealed on 31 March 2021. It is made mainly for the Indian market, under the VW Group's India 2.0 plan. The only visible changes made to the car are the downsizing of the wheels for 19 inches to 17 inches. The 1.0-litre engine is available with 6-speed manual and 6-speed torque converter automatic, while the 1.5-litre TSI unit is available with a 6-speed manual and a 7-speed dual-clutch. It went on sale on 23 September 2021.

The VW Taigun is being exported from India to Indonesia as the VW T-Cross. It went on sale in Indonesia in February 2022 and is distributed by VW's local Indonesian importer/distributor, PT Garuda Mataram Motor. Additionally, beginning in 2022, the VW Taigun is being exported from India to Mexico as the VW T-Cross, replacing the previous Brazilian-sourced Mexican market T-Cross. The VW Taigun exported from India as the T-Cross uses the MQB-A0-IN platform unlike T-Cross models made in Europe, Brazil, and China which use the MQB-A0 platform.

Powertrain

Safety 
The Volkswagen Taigun is sold in India with a standard safety specification of two frontal airbags, i-Size approved ISOFIX anchorages, Electronic Stability Control, three-point seatbelts in all seats and post-collision braking. Higher trim levels are additionally equipped with side torso airbags and head-protecting curtains, and a tyre pressure monitor. Left hand-drive versions of the Taigun (exported to Mexico as the T-Cross) are equipped with safety assist technologies like Autonomous Emergency Braking, which are not available in India, and they have side airbags available as standard instead of as an option.

In October 2022 the Taigun was independently crash-tested by the Global New Car Assessment Programme (Global NCAP) at Volkswagen's expense, and scored five stars for adult and child occupant protection, the first car to do so under the organisation's new assessment protocols. In the frontal offset test, protection of all body regions was good or acceptable, except for the driver's left tibia. In the side mobile barrier and pole tests, protection of the driver's chest was rated marginal, and protection of the driver's abdomen was rated acceptable in the side pole test. The Taigun could pass minimum European regulatory requirements for electronic stability control and pedestrian protection.

Concept version 

Unrelated to the 2021 Taigun, the Volkswagen Taigun nameplate debuted as a near-production concept subcompact crossover SUV. Targeting Europe, Brazil and India as main markets, it had the potential of replacing the hatchback CrossFox, and slotting below the Tiguan compact crossover SUV, competing against mini crossover SUVs alongside the Nissan Juke, the Mini Countryman and the Suzuki SX4.

The prototype was unveiled at the 2012 São Paulo International Motor Show. The Taigun was planned to be unveiled by the Volkswagen Group for the model year of 2016, however the plan was scrapped. The car was deemed too small, contrary with the market trend and was instead replaced by the Volkswagen T-Cross which went on sale in 2018.

References

External links

 Official website (India)

Crossover sport utility vehicles
Front-wheel-drive vehicles
Mini sport utility vehicles
Taigun
Cars introduced in 2021
Taigun
Global NCAP small off-road